Nalin Surie was an Indian Civil servant and was the Indian ambassador to United Kingdom.

Positions held
Ambassador to China.
Head of Indian Council of World Affairs.
MEA secretary (west).

Indian Foreign Service
He is a 1973  batch officer of the Indian Foreign Service.

High Commission of India to the United Kingdom

External links
Ambassador of India to the People’s Republic of China

References

Ambassadors of India to China
Indian Foreign Service officers
High Commissioners of India to the United Kingdom
Year of birth missing (living people)
Living people